Beauty and the Bastard is a 2005 Finnish musical romantic drama film directed by Dome Karukoski and written by Pekko Pesonen. It stars Pamela Tola and Samuli Vauramo. Eero Milonoff, Joonas Saartamo, Mikko Leppilampi and Mikko Kouki play supporting roles. It is the feature-film debut of director Dome Karukoski, who had previous experience from commercials and short films. The music was composed by Jukka Immonen's Friend Music.

The reception was universally mediocre from the biggest newspapers' critics. VG, Aftenposten, Dagbladet, Dagsavisen and Bergens Tidende all issued a "die throw" of 3.

Cast
Pamela Tola as Nelli 
Samuli Vauramo as Sune 
Joonas Saartamo as Kondis 
Eero Milonoff as Isukki 
Jussi Nikkilä as Mikko 
Elena Leeve as Mari 
Mikko Kouki as Anssi 
Mikko Leppilampi as D.T. 
Anna-Leena Härkönen as Hilkka

References

External links
 Official website
 
http://www.freeyourmind.fi/jutut/2005/tsot/index_121005.php

2005 films
Films directed by Dome Karukoski
2000s Finnish-language films
2005 romantic drama films
2000s hip hop films
2000s romantic musical films
Finnish romantic drama films
Finnish musical drama films
2000s musical drama films